Into the Fire may refer to:

Film
Into the Fire (1988 film), a 1988 thriller film directed by Graeme Campbell
Into the Fire (1989 film), a 1989 Hong Kong film produced by Sammo Hung
Into the Fire (2005 film), a 2005 film directed by Michael Phelan
Into the Fire (2007 film), a 2007 documentary film directed by Bill Couturié
71: Into the Fire, a 2010 Korean War film directed by John H. Lee

Television
Into the Fire (TV series), a 1996 British television series, written by Tony Marchant
Into the Fire, a food-based reality show airing on Food Network
"Into the Fire" (Stargate SG-1), an episode of the television series Stargate SG-1
"Into the Fire" (Babylon 5), an episode of the science-fiction television series Babylon 5
Into the Fire, a 2018 documentary series following the varied callouts of West Midlands Fire Service

Music
Into the Fire (album), a 1987 album by Bryan Adams, also a song on the same album
"Into the Fire" (Sarah McLachlan song), a song by Sarah McLachlan from her 1991 album Solace
"Into the Fire" (Thirteen Senses song), a song by Thirteen Senses from their 2004 album The Invitation
"Into the Fire", a song by Bruce Springsteen from his 2002 album The Rising
"Into The Fire" (Dokken song), a song by Dokken from their 1984 album Tooth and Nail
"Into the Fire", a song by Deep Purple from their 1970 album Deep Purple in Rock
"Into the Fire", a song by Marilyn Manson from their 2009 album The High End of Low
"Into the Fire", a song by Running Wild from their 2000 album Victory
"Into The Fire", a song by Sabaton from their 2005 album Primo Victoria
"Into the Fire", a song from the musical The Scarlet Pimpernel
"Into the Fire" (Asking Alexandria song), a 2017 song by Asking Alexandria

Other
NWA Into the Fire, a professional wrestling pay-per-view event